is a Japanese politician of the Liberal Democratic Party, a member of the House of Representatives in the Diet (national legislature). A native of Usa District, Ōita and graduate of Meiji University, he ran unsuccessfully for mayor of Nakatsu, Ōita in 1987 but was elected to the assembly of Ōita Prefecture in 1991. After an unsuccessful run in 2000, he was elected to the House of Representatives for the first time in 2003.

References

External links 
 Official website in Japanese.

1951 births
Living people
Politicians from Ōita Prefecture
Members of the Ōita Prefectural Assembly
Members of the House of Representatives (Japan)
Liberal Democratic Party (Japan) politicians
21st-century Japanese politicians